Leopold I (Leopold Ignaz Joseph Balthasar Franz Felician; ; 9 June 1640 – 5 May 1705) was Holy Roman Emperor, King of Hungary, Croatia, and Bohemia. The second son of Ferdinand III, Holy Roman Emperor, by his first wife, Maria Anna of Spain, Leopold became heir apparent in 1654 by the death of his elder brother Ferdinand IV. Elected in 1658, Leopold ruled the Holy Roman Empire until his death in 1705, becoming the second longest-ruling Habsburg emperor (46 years and 9 months). He was both a composer and considerable patron of music.

Leopold's reign is known for conflicts with the Ottoman Empire in the Great Turkish War (1683–1699) and rivalry with Louis XIV, a contemporary and first cousin (on the maternal side; fourth cousin on the paternal side), in the west. After more than a decade of warfare, Leopold emerged victorious in the east thanks to the military talents of Prince Eugene of Savoy. By the Treaty of Karlowitz, Leopold recovered almost all of the Kingdom of Hungary, which had fallen under Turkish power in the years after the 1526 Battle of Mohács.

Leopold fought three wars against France: the Franco-Dutch War, the Nine Years' War, and the War of the Spanish Succession. In this last, Leopold sought to give his younger son Charles the entire Spanish inheritance, disregarding the will of the late Charles II. Leopold started a war that soon engulfed much of Europe. The early years of the war went fairly well for Austria, with victories at Schellenberg and Blenheim, but the war would drag on until 1714, nine years after Leopold's death, which barely had an effect on the warring nations. When peace returned with the Treaty of Rastatt, Austria could not be said to have emerged as triumphant as it had from the war against the Turks.

Early years

Born on 9 June 1640 in Vienna, Leopold received the traditional program of education in the liberal arts, history, literature, natural science and astronomy. He was particularly interested in music, as his father emperor Ferdinand III had been. From an early age Leopold showed an inclination toward learning. He became fluent in Latin, Italian, German, French, and Spanish. In addition to German, Italian would be the most favored language at his court.

Likewise he had received comprehensive ecclesiastical training as he had originally been selected for a career in the higher clergy. This plan, though, was dropped upon the 1654 death of his older brother, Ferdinand IV, when Leopold became heir apparent. Nonetheless, Leopold's spiritual education had had a manifest impact on him. Leopold remained under the spell of his clerical education and Jesuit influence throughout his life. For a monarch he was uncommonly knowledgeable about theology, metaphysics, jurisprudence and the sciences. He also retained his interest in astrology and alchemy which he had developed under Jesuit tutors. A deeply religious and devoted person, Leopold personified the pietas Austriaca, or the loyal Catholic attitude of his house. On the other hand, his piety and education may have caused in him a fatalistic strain which inclined him to reject all compromise on denominational questions, which is not always considered a positive characteristic of a ruler.

Leopold was said to have typical Habsburg physical attributes, such as the prominent Habsburg lower jaw. Short, thin, and of sick constitution, Leopold was cold and reserved in public and socially inept. However, he is also said to have been open with close associates. Coxe described Leopold in the following manner: "His gait was stately, slow and deliberate; his air pensive, his address awkward, his manner uncouth, his disposition cold and phlegmatic." Spielman argues that his long-expected career in the clergy caused Leopold to have "early adopted the intense Catholic piety expected of him and the gentle manners appropriate to a merely supporting role. He grew to manhood without the military ambition that characterized most of his fellow monarchs. From the beginning, his reign was defensive and profoundly conservative."

Elected king of Hungary in 1655, he followed suit in 1656 and 1657 in Bohemia and Croatia respectively. In July 1658, more than a year after his father's death, Leopold was elected Holy Roman Emperor at Frankfurt in opposition to the French Cardinal Mazarin, who sought to place the Imperial Crown on the head of Prince-elector Ferdinand Maria or some other non-Habsburg prince. To conciliate France, which had considerable influence in German affairs thanks to the League of the Rhine, the newly elected Emperor promised not to assist Spain, then at war with France. This marked the beginning of a nearly 47-year reign characterized by a lasting rivalry with France and its king, Louis XIV. The latters dominant personality and power completely overshadowed Leopold, even to this day. Although Leopold did not lead his troops in person as Louis XIV did, he was no less a warrior-king given the greater part of his public life was directed towards the arrangement and furtherance of wars.

Second Northern War
Leopold's first war was the Second Northern War (1655–1660), in which King Charles X of Sweden tried to become King of Poland with the aid of allies including György II Rákóczi, Prince of Transylvania. Leopold's predecessor, Ferdinand III, had allied with King John II Casimir Vasa of Poland in 1656. In 1657, Leopold expanded this alliance to include Austrian troops (paid by Poland). These troops helped defeat the Transylvanian army, and campaigned as far as Denmark. The war ended with the Treaty of Oliwa in 1660.

Early wars against the Ottoman Empire
The Ottoman Empire often interfered in the affairs of Transylvania, always an unruly district, and this interference brought on a war with the Holy Roman Empire, which after some desultory operations really began in 1663. By a personal appeal to the diet at Regensburg Leopold induced the princes to send assistance for the campaign; troops were also sent by France, and in August 1664, the great Imperial general Raimondo Montecuccoli gained a notable victory at Saint Gotthard. By the Peace of Vasvár the Emperor made a twenty years' truce with the Sultan, granting more generous terms than his recent victory seemed to render necessary.

Wars against France

French expansion increasingly threatened the Empire, especially the seizure of the strategic Duchy of Lorraine in 1670, followed by the 1672 Franco-Dutch War. By mid June, the Dutch Republic tethered at the brink of destruction, which lead Leopold to agree to an alliance with Brandenburg-Prussia and the Republic on June 25. However, he was also pondering a revolt in Hungary and viewed French conquests in the Rhineland a higher priority than helping the Dutch. His commander, Raimondo Montecuccoli, was ordered to remain on the defensive and avoid a direct conflict. Chaotic logistics made it impossible to maintain the troops and Brandenburg left the war in June 1673 under the Treaty of Vossem.

An anti-French Quadruple Alliance was formed in August, consisting of the Republic, Spain, Emperor Leopold, and the Duke of Lorraine, while in May 1674, the Imperial Diet declared it an Imperial war. The 1678 Treaty of Nijmegen is generally seen as a French victory, although the Alliance succeeded in limiting their gains.

Almost immediately after the conclusion of peace Louis renewed his aggressions on the German frontier through the Réunions policy. Engaged in a serious struggle with the Ottoman Empire, the emperor was again slow to move, and although he joined the Association League against France in 1682 he was glad to make a truce at Regensburg two years later. In 1686 the League of Augsburg was formed by the emperor and the imperial princes, to preserve the terms of the treaties of Westphalia and of Nijmegen. The whole European position was now bound up with events in England, and the tension lasted until 1688, when William III of Orange won the English crown through the Glorious Revolution and Louis invaded Germany. In May 1689, the Grand Alliance was formed, including the emperor, the kings of England, Spain and Denmark, the elector of Brandenburg and others, and a fierce struggle against France was waged throughout almost the whole of Western Europe. In general the several campaigns were favourable to the allies, and in September 1697, England, Spain and the United Provinces made peace with France at the Treaty of Rijswijk.

Leopold refused to assent to the treaty, as he considered that his allies had somewhat neglected his interests, but in the following month he came to terms and a number of places were transferred from France to Germany. The peace with France lasted for about four years and then Europe was involved in the War of the Spanish Succession. The king of Spain, Charles II, was a Habsburg by descent and was related by marriage to the Austrian branch, while a similar tie bound him to the royal house of France. He was feeble and childless, and attempts had been made by the European powers to arrange for a peaceable division of his extensive kingdom. Leopold refused to consent to any partition, and when in November 1700 Charles died, leaving his crown to Philippe de France, Duke of Anjou, a grandson of Louis XIV, all hopes of a peaceable settlement vanished. Under the guidance of William III a powerful league, a renewed Grand Alliance, was formed against France; of this the emperor was a prominent member, and in 1703 he transferred his claim on the Spanish monarchy to his second son, Charles. The early course of the war was not favorable to the Imperialists, but the tide of defeat had been rolled back by the great victory of Blenheim before Leopold died on 5 May 1705.

Internal problems

The emperor himself defined the guidelines of the politics. Johann Weikhard of Auersperg was overthrown in 1669 as the leading minister. He was followed by Wenzel Eusebius, Prince of Lobkowicz. Both had arranged some connections to France without the knowledge of the emperor. In 1674 also Lobkowicz lost his appointment.

In governing his own lands Leopold found his chief difficulties in Hungary, where unrest was caused partly by his desire to crush Protestantism and partly by the so-called Magnate conspiracy. A rising was suppressed in 1671 and for some years Hungary was treated with great severity. In 1681, after another rising, some grievances were removed and a less repressive policy was adopted, but this did not deter the Hungarians from revolting again. Espousing the cause of the rebels the sultan sent an enormous army into Austria early in 1683; this advanced almost unchecked to Vienna, which was besieged from July to September, while Leopold took refuge at Passau. Realizing the gravity of the situation somewhat tardily, some of the German princes, among them the electors of Saxony and Bavaria, led their contingents to the Imperial Army, which was commanded by the emperor's brother-in-law, Charles, duke of Lorraine, but the most redoubtable of Leopold's allies was the king of Poland, John III Sobieski, who was already dreaded by the Turks. Austrian forces occupied the castle of Trebišov in 1675, but in 1682 Imre Thököly captured it and then fled from continuous Austrian attacks, so they blew the castle up, leaving it in ruins. They fled as supposedly Hungarian rebel troops under the command of Imre Thököly, cooperating with the Turks, and sacked the city of Bielsko in 1682. In 1692, Leopold gave up his rights to the property, giving his rights by donation to Theresia Keglević.

He also expelled Jewish communities from his realm, for example the Viennese Jewish community, which used to live in an area called "Im Werd" across the Danube Canal. After the expulsion of the Jewish population, with popular support, the area was renamed Leopoldstadt as a thanksgiving. But Frederick William I, Elector of Brandenburg, issued an edict in 1677, in which he announced his special protection for 50 families of these expelled Jews.

Success against the Turks and in Hungary

On 12 September 1683, the allied army fell upon the enemy, who was completely routed, and Vienna was saved. The imperial forces, among whom Prince Eugene of Savoy was rapidly becoming prominent, followed up the victory with others, notably one near Mohács in 1687 and another at Zenta in 1697, and in January 1699, the sultan signed the treaty of Karlowitz by which he admitted the sovereign rights of the house of Habsburg over nearly the whole of Hungary (including Serbs in Vojvodina). As the Habsburg forces retreated, they withdrew 37,000 Serb families under Patriarch Arsenije III Čarnojević of the Serbian Patriarchate of Peć. In 1690 and 1691 Emperor Leopold I had conceived through a number of edicts (Privileges) the autonomy of Serbs in his Empire, which would last and develop for more than two centuries until its abolition in 1912. Before the conclusion of the war, however, Leopold had taken measures to strengthen his hold upon this country. In 1687, the Hungarian diet in Pressburg (now Bratislava) changed the constitution, the right of the Habsburgs to succeed to the throne without election was admitted and the emperor's elder son Joseph I was crowned hereditary king of Hungary.

The Holy Roman Empire
The Peace of Westphalia in 1648 had been a political defeat for the Habsburgs. It ended the idea that Europe was a single Christian empire; governed spiritually by the Pope and temporally by the Holy Roman Emperor. Moreover, the treaty was devoted to parceling out land and influence to the "winners", the anti-Habsburg alliance led by France and Sweden. However, the Habsburgs did gain some benefits out of the wars; the Protestant aristocracy in Habsburg territories had been decimated, and the ties between Vienna and the Habsburg domains in Bohemia and elsewhere were greatly strengthened. These changes would allow Leopold to initiate necessary political and institutional reforms during his reign to develop somewhat of an absolutist state along French lines. The most important consequences of the war was in retrospect to weaken the Habsburgs as emperors but strengthen them in their own lands. Leopold was the first to realize this altered state of affairs and act in accordance with it.

Administrative reform
The reign of Leopold saw some important changes made in the constitution of the Empire. In 1663 the imperial diet entered upon the last stage of its existence, and became a body permanently in session at Regensburg. This perpetual diet would become a vital tool for consolidation of Habsburg power under Leopold.

Political changes
In 1692, the duke of Hanover was raised to the rank of an elector, becoming the ninth member of the electoral college. In 1700, Leopold, greatly in need of help for the impending war with France, granted the title of king in Prussia to the elector of Brandenburg. The net result of these and similar changes was to weaken the authority of the emperor over the members of the Empire and to compel him to rely more and more upon his position as ruler of the Austrian archduchies and of Hungary and Bohemia.

Character and overall assessment
Leopold was a man of industry and education, and during his later years, he showed some political ability. Regarding himself as an absolute sovereign, he was extremely tenacious of his rights. Greatly influenced by the Jesuits, he was a staunch proponent of the Counter-Reformation. In person, he was short, but strong and healthy. Although he had no inclination for a military life, he loved exercise in the open air, such as hunting and riding; he also had a taste and talent for music and
composed several Oratorios and Suites of Dances.

Perhaps due to inbreeding among his progenitors, the hereditary Habsburg jaw was most prominent in Leopold. Because his jaw was depicted unusually large on a 1670 silver coin, Leopold was nicknamed "the Hogmouth"; however, most collectors do not believe the coin was an accurate depiction.

Marriages and children

In 1666, he married Margaret Theresa of Spain (1651–1673), daughter of King Philip IV of Spain, who was both his niece and his first cousin. She was depicted in Diego Velázquez' paintings sent from the court of Madrid to Leopold as he waited in Vienna for his fiancée to grow up. Leopold and Margaret Theresa had four children:

 Archduke Ferdinand Wenzel (1667–1668)
 Archduchess Maria Antonia (1669–1692), who married Maximilian II Emanuel, Elector of Bavaria.
 Archduke Johann Leopold (1670)
 Archduchess Maria Anna Antonia (1672)

His second wife was Claudia Felicitas of Austria, who died in 1676 at the age of 22. Neither of their two daughters survived:

 Archduchess Anna Maria Josepha (1674)
 Archduchess Maria Josepha Clementina (1675–1676)

His third wife was Eleonor Magdalene of Neuburg. They had the following children:

 Joseph I, Holy Roman Emperor (1678–1711), who married Wilhelmine Amalia of Brunswick-Lüneburg
 Archduchess Maria Christina (1679)
 Archduchess Maria Elisabeth (1680–1741), Governor of the Austrian Netherlands
 Archduke Leopold Joseph (1682–1684)
 Archduchess Maria Anna (1683–1754) married John V of Portugal
 Archduchess Maria Theresa (1684–1696)
 Charles VI, Holy Roman Emperor (1685–1740), who married Elisabeth Christine of Brunswick-Wolfenbüttel
 Archduchess Maria Josepha (1687–1703)
 Archduchess Maria Magdalena (1689–1743)
 Archduchess Maria Margaret (1690–1691)

Music
Like his father, Leopold was a patron of music and a composer. He continued to enrich the court's musical life by employing and providing support for distinguished composers such as Antonio Bertali, Giovanni Bononcini, Johann Kaspar Kerll, Ferdinand Tobias Richter, Alessandro Poglietti, and Johann Fux. Leopold's surviving works show the influence of Bertali and Viennese composers in general (in oratorios and other dramatic works), and of Johann Heinrich Schmelzer (in ballets and German comedies). His sacred music is perhaps his most successful, particularly Missa angeli custodis, a Requiem Mass for his first wife, and Three Lections, composed for the burial of his second wife. Much of Leopold's music was published with works by his father, and described as "works of exceeding high merit."

Titles
The full titulature of Leopold after he had become emperor went as follows: "Leopold I, by the grace of God elected Holy Roman Emperor, forever August, King of Germany, King of Hungary, King of Bohemia, Dalmatia, Croatia, Slavonia, Rama, Serbia, Galicia, Lodomeria, Cumania, Bulgaria, Archduke of Austria, Duke of Burgundy, Brabant, Styria, Carinthia, Carniola, Margrave of Moravia, Duke of Luxemburg, of the Upper and Lower Silesia, of Württemberg and Teck, Prince of Swabia, Count of Habsburg, Tyrol, Kyburg and Gorizia, Landgrave of Alsace, Marquess of the Holy Roman Empire, Burgovia, the Enns, the Upper and Lower Lusatia, Lord of the Marquisate of Slavonia, of Port Naon and Salines, etc. etc."

Coins

Ancestors

See also
 Academy of Sciences Leopoldina
 Family tree of the German monarchs

References

Sources
 
 Crankshaw, Edward, The Habsburgs: Portrait of a Dynasty (New York, The Viking Press, 1971).
 
 
 Frey, Linda and Marsha Frey. A Question of Empire: Leopold I and the War of Spanish Succession, 1701–1705  (1983)
 Goloubeva, Maria. The Glorification of Emperor Leopold I in Image, Spectacle and Text (Mainz, 2000) (Veröffentlichungen des Instituts für Europäische Geschichte. Abteilung für Universalgeschichte, 184).

External links

Regnal titles

1640 births
1705 deaths
17th-century Holy Roman Emperors
18th-century Holy Roman Emperors
17th-century archdukes of Austria
18th-century archdukes of Austria
German monarchs
Burials at the Imperial Crypt
Burials at St. Stephen's Cathedral, Vienna
Austrian Baroque composers
Male classical composers
Musicians from Vienna
Dukes of Teschen
Grand Masters of the Order of the Golden Fleece
Knights of the Golden Fleece
Leopoldstadt
People of the Great Turkish War
17th-century classical composers
Dukes of Carniola
Sons of emperors
Austrian patrons of music
 
Children of Ferdinand III, Holy Roman Emperor